R. Barrie Walkley (born 1944) is a career foreign service officer and the former Special Advisor to Secretary of State Clinton for the Great Lakes and the Democratic Republic of the Congo.  He was appointed to this position in December 2011 and served until June 18, 2013, when he was replaced by former U.S. Senator Russ Feingold.

Previously, he served as the American ambassador to Gabon and later to concurrent appointments to Guinea and to Sao Tome and Principe. He was called back to service and appointed Chargé d'Affaires for South Sudan at its independence. (Susan D. Page later became the first ambassador.)  He holds degrees from the University of California, Santa Barbara, the University of California, Los Angeles and the University of Southern California. He and his wife Annabelle were Peace Corps volunteers in Somalia (1967–1969).

References

1944 births
Living people
Ambassadors of the United States to Guinea
Ambassadors of the United States to South Sudan
Obama administration personnel
Ambassadors of the United States to Gabon
United States Foreign Service personnel
Ambassadors of the United States to São Tomé and Príncipe
21st-century American diplomats